The PEPS Effect (Photoelectochemical Photocurrent Switching) is a phenomenon seen in semiconducting electrodes. It is defined as switching of photocurrent polarity on changes in photoelectrode potential and/or incident light wavelength.

Konrad Szaciłowski and Wojciech Macyk were the first to describe it in their publication in 2006. The discovered phenomenon opens a wide variety of applications in construction of switches, logic gates and sensors based on chemical systems.

References

Bibliography 
 S. Gawęda, A. Podborska, W. Macyk and K. Szaciowski, Nanoscale optoelectronic switches and logic devices, Nanoscale, 2009, 1, 299 

Solar cells
Semiconductors